Fort Pearce is a former fort established in Washington, Utah before Utah became a state. It was built by settlers of the Church of Jesus Christ of Latter-day Saints to protect themselves from Navajo Native Americans in the midst of the Black Hawk War of 1865–1872. Initial construction began on December 4, 1866, and was done by six men. It was expanded with a corral built by nineteen men, including Charles L. Walker, in 1869. The fort was named in honor of Captain John David Lafayette Pearce. The ruins have been listed on the National Register of Historic Places since November 20, 1975.

References

Pearce
National Register of Historic Places in Washington County, Utah
Buildings and structures completed in 1866
1866 establishments in Utah Territory